Crescendo of Doom is a board game published in 1980 by Avalon Hill.

Contents
Crescendo of Doom is an expansion for Squad Leader (called gamettes by the publisher).

COD provides blanket coverage to the Western Front of 1939–1941, including French and British infantry, vehicles and ordnance (most tanks and guns being palpably less powerful than the late-war equipment in the previous gamette, giving an interesting feel to the scenarios) as well as infantry for Finland - elite troops who had the rare ability to rally themselves without the presence of a leader - and the "Allied Minors" including Belgium, Norway, Poland and the Netherlands.  Like COI, a complete order of battle of British and French armor and ordnance is included, though American built vehicles in British service are not included (which was consistent with the pre-1942 timeframe of the gamette). Whereas COI expands the armor and artillery rules, COD gives more nuanced rules regarding the infantry and other foot soldiers, including such things as cowering and pinning, while introducing Scouts and morale disadvantages for early war infantry facing off against tanks. Additionally, many new terrain types are introduced on the two new mapboards, including marsh, river, large bridges, and orchards, as well as no less than three kinds of boats to cross a river with - Scenario 27 covers the crossing of the Meuse at Dinant by parts of the German 7th Panzer Division, with a highly-rated leader counter deemed to represent Erwin Rommel himself taking personal command.

Publication history
Even before Squad Leader debuted, plans were being made to expand the initial release; these expansions would be called "gamettes" and concentrate on particular eras or theatres, all the while developing the basic game system with additional rules, new weapons types, and different terrain.

Just as COD was finalizing its playtesting, plans were made for two further gamettes; the September–October 1979 issue of The General Magazine announced that GI: Anvil of Victory would include both American and Italian forces, and that a fifth and final gamette covering the Japanese would be released a year after that.

Three sets of "official" scenarios were released by Avalon Hill directly.  Series 200 (scenarios 201-210) was designed for Crescendo of Doom.

Reception
Lorrin Bird described the current state of the armor game after COD's release in an article printed in Special Issue #2 of Campaign Magazine:

While the original Squad Leader game was a work of art with regard to its fine balance of playability and detail...the gamettes are coming to represent the "masterpieces" of wargamedom due to the unbelievable trivia that is included.  From radioless AFV's to the benefits/handicaps of having the commander exposed, the expanding Squad Leader system is investigating and providing rules for many features of WWII armored combat that were previously overlooked in other boardgames and even miniature systems...The end result of the amazing efforts being made to make the SL system as complete as possible is that one is presented with tanks which act pretty much like they did in real life...

James Collier, in a piece entitled "Glass Anvil: A Dissenting View of GI: Anvil of Victory", presented in Volume 20, Number 1 of The General, described the situation:

By now it should be recognized that the Squad Leader series is virtually unique among WWII board games by being a game in evolution.  The succeeding gamettes have not been mere additions to the original, but instead have introduced substantial revisions to the original parameters.  This is even more true with GI where the bulk of both components and rules represent revisions rather than new material.  There are, for example, only 300 more counters than provided with CRESCENDO OF DOOM, and well over half the GI counters represent replacements for counters previously introduced (only a handful of the original SL counters are still usuable (sic) in their printed form)...

Though one must pay the price of forfeiting obsolete materials above and beyond the purchase price, the loss can be accepted as the cost of progress.  There are few who would quibble with the appropriateness of the added dimensions of the revised vehicle and ordnance counters presented in CROSS OF IRON.  That process is, of course, carried forward in COD and GI to include the relevant nationalities.  Now GI introduces a similar order of revision for the infantry counters in addition to a number of new maneuvers and capabilities.  As this evolution continues, one is eventually compelled to ask where it is going and why?

At the 1981 Origins Awards, Crescendo of Doom won the Charles S. Roberts Award for Best 20th Century Boardgame of 1980.

Reviews
Moves #51, page 11-14

References

Avalon Hill games
Board games introduced in 1980
Origins Award winners
Squad Leader